Dumka (dúmka, plural думки, dúmky) is a musical term introduced from the Ukrainian language, with cognates in other Slavic languages. The word dumka literally means "thought".  Originally, it was the diminutive form of the Ukrainian term duma, pl. dumy, "a Slavic (specifically Ukrainian) epic ballad …  generally thoughtful or melancholic in character". Classical composers drew on the harmonic patterns in the folk music to inform their more formal classical compositions.  

The composition of dumky became popular after the publication of an ethnological study and analysis and a number of illustrated lectures made by the Ukrainian composer Mykola Lysenko in 1873 and 1874 in Kyiv and Saint Petersburg. They were illustrated by live performances by the blind kobzar Ostap Veresai, who performed a number of dumky, singing and accompanying himself on the bandura. Lysenko's study was the first to specifically analyse the melodies and the accompaniment played on the bandura, kobza or lira of the epic dumy.  

A natural part of the process of transferring the traditional folk form to a formal classical milieu was the appropriation of the Dumka form by Slavic composers, most especially by the Czech composer Antonín Dvořák. Thus, in classical music, dumka came to mean "a type of instrumental music involving sudden changes from melancholy to exuberance". Though generally characterized by a gently plodding, dreamy duple rhythm, many examples are in triple metre, including Dvořák's Slavonic dance (Op. 72 No. 4). His last and best-known piano trio, No. 4 in E minor, Op. 90, has six movements, each of which is a dumka; the work is referred at times by its subtitle, Dumky Trio.

Examples
Major examples in the classical repertoire include:

Antonín Dvořák

Furiant with Dumka, Op. 12 (1884) for piano solo
Dumka (Elegy), Op. 35 (1876) for piano solo
Slavonic Dances, Op. 46 and 72, (Three of the sixteen)
Violin Concerto in A minor, Op. 53, mvt. 3 – though based on a Furiant, the middle part is a Dumka
String Sextet in A, Op. 48 (1878), mvt. 2: "Dumka: Poco allegretto"
Piano Quintet No. 2 in A, Op. 81 (1887), mvt. 2: "Dumka: Andante con moto"
Piano Trio No. 4 in E minor, Op. 90 (1891) — the Dumky-Trio
String Quartet No. 10 in E-Flat Major, Op. 51 – B. 92: II. Dumka. Andante Con Moto

Sofia Mavrogenidou
Dumka for piano solo
Dumka for flute, cello and piano
Dumka for cello and piano
Dumka for accordion and flute

Leoš Janáček

Dumka for violin & piano

Bohuslav Martinů

Dumka (unnumbered), H. 4 (1909 – Polička, Czechoslovakia), for solo piano
Dumka No. 1, H. 249 (1936 – Paris, France), for solo piano
Dumka No. 2, H. 250 (1936 – Paris, France), for solo piano
Dumka No. 3, H. 285bis (1941 – Jamaica, NY, USA), for solo piano

Pyotr Tchaikovsky

Dumka, Op. 59 (Scenes from a Russian village) for solo piano (1886)

Others 
Anatoly Kos-Anatolsky, Dumka and kolomiyka from the opera Sojchyne krylo
Mily Balakirev, Dumka in E flat minor (1900)
Vasyl Barvinsky, Dumka (1925)
Alexander Borodin, Dumka (from the piano quintet nr.2 in A Major, op. 81)
Frédéric Chopin, Dumka, Op. 74 No. 19, KK IVb/9, CT. 147
Rebecca Clarke, Dumka, Duo Concertante for Violin and Viola, with Piano (1941)
Franz Liszt, Dumka, S 249B
Mykola Lysenko, 2nd piano rhapsody (1877)
Stanisław Moniuszko, Jontek's aria from the opera Halka
Modest Mussorgsky, Paraska's aria from the opera Sorochynsky fair
Sergei Prokofiev, Dumka in A minor (published posthumously)
M. Shneider-Trnavsky, Dumka and dance for symphony orchestra (1909)
M. Zawadsky, 12 dumky and 42 shumky
V. Zaremba
S. Zaremba
Nikolai Budashkin, Dumka (Träumerei) in the Andante from the 'Concerto for Domra and Orchestra' Op.8 (1943).

Notes

References 
 S. I. Gritsa (Hrytsa) Dumi vidayushcheyesya dostoyaniye ukrainskoy kulturi (Dumy a remarkable product of Ukrainian culture) Musica anticqua Europae orientalis II Bydgosz, 1969.(In Russian) 
 M. Antonowych Dumka and Duma in MGG

Kobzarstvo
Song forms
Russian styles of music
Ukrainian styles of music
Musical terminology